This article lists links to articles relating to the ongoing COVID-19 pandemic within the British Overseas Territories.

Africa
 Saint Helena, Ascension and Tristan da Cunha

Asia
 Akrotiri and Dhekelia
 British Indian Ocean Territory

Europe
 Gibraltar

North America
 Anguilla
 Bermuda
 British Virgin Islands
 Cayman Islands
 Montserrat
 Turks and Caicos Islands

South America
 Falkland Islands

British Overseas Territories without confirmed cases